"Cake" is a song by the American rapper Flo Rida, from the Atlantic Records compilation album This Is a Challenge. The song features the American rap duo 99 Percent. It was released to contemporary hit radio as a single on February 28, 2017.

Music video
The official music video was released March 15, 2017.

Commercial performance
The song debuted at number 89 on the Billboard Hot 100 for the week ending May 6, 2017. It peaked at number 73, charting for six weeks.

Charts

Certifications

References

External links

2017 singles
2016 songs
Atlantic Records singles
Flo Rida songs
Songs written by Flo Rida
Songs written by Breyan Isaac